This is a list of seasons completed by the Monmouth Hawks football team. Representing Monmouth University in West Long Branch, New Jersey, the Hawks compete in the Big South Conference as a member of the NCAA Division I FCS. Since its inception in 1992, the Monmouth football program has been led by head coach Kevin Callahan, the first and only head coach in Monmouth football history. The team plays its home games at the 3,200-seat Kessler Field.

Monmouth has captured five conference titles, all of which came during its tenure in the Northeast Conference from 1996 to 2012. They have played in two lower-level bowl games, and made the NCAA Division I FCS playoffs for the first time in program history in 2017.

Seasons

Notes

References

Monmouth

Monmouth Hawks football seasons